John David Jackson (born May 17, 1963) is an American former professional boxer who competed from 1984 to 1999, and has since worked as a boxing trainer. He is a two-weight world champion, having held the WBO junior middleweight title twice between 1988 and 1993, and the WBA middleweight title from 1993 to 1994.

Professional career
Jackson turned professional in 1984 and won his first 20 fights. He won the inaugural WBO junior middleweight title in 1988 with a win over Lupe Aquino. He defended the title six times before moving up to middleweight in 1993 to take on WBA middleweight champion Reggie Johnson, winning a close decision.

After being stripped of his WBA title in August 1994, Jackson lost in an attempt to regain the belt in December of that year to Jorge Castro via 9th-round TKO, in a fight that was named Fight of the Year by Ring Magazine. On the verge of forcing a referee's stoppage against the badly beaten up Castro, Jackson was caught and knocked down by a left hook, then stopped after two further knockdowns. The sudden change in fortunes was one of the greatest turnarounds ever seen in a boxing match.

In 1997 he took on Bernard Hopkins for the IBF middleweight title. In an ugly fight in which Jackson looked a faded fighter, Hopkins won via a 7th-round TKO. Jackson took a rematch with Castro in 1998, but again came up short in losing a decision. He retired in 1999.

Professional boxing record

Training career 
After his professional boxing career ended, Jackson has worked as a trainer. Boxers he has worked with include:
Claressa Shields (starting with her bout with Hanna Gabriel)
Sergey Kovalev
Kimbo Slice (UFC fighter turned pro boxer)
Allan Green (starting with his bout Anthony Bonsante)
Bernard Hopkins (for his bout with Antonio Tarver)
Shane Mosley (starting with his second bout with Winky Wright and ending after his first bout with Fernando Vargas)
Nate Campbell (The first fighter Jackson led to a world title)
Dyah Davis (Son of 1976 Olympic gold medalist Howard Davis Jr.)
Brad Solomon
Khabib Allakhverdiev
Magomed Abdusalamov
Chris Algieri
Curtis Stevens (currently)

References

External links

1963 births
Living people
World Boxing Association champions
World Boxing Organization champions
Light-middleweight boxers
Boxers from Denver
American male boxers
Middleweight boxers
Super-middleweight boxers
World light-middleweight boxing champions
World middleweight boxing champions